Diploknema sebifera is a plant in the family Sapotaceae. The bark is greyish brown. Inflorescences bear up to 10 reddish brown flowers. Habitat is lowland dipterocarp forests from sea-level to  altitude. D. sebifera is endemic to Borneo.

References

sebifera
Plants described in 1884
Endemic flora of Borneo
Trees of Borneo